Lochend is a settlement that lies at the start of the Caledonian Canal,  at the head of Loch Ness in Inverness-shire, Scottish Highlands and is in the Scottish council area of Highland.

It is the location of the Bona Lighthouse.

Populated places in Inverness committee area
Hamlets in Scotland
Loch Ness